Cellettes is a commune in the Loir-et-Cher department, central France.

Population

See also
Communes of the Loir-et-Cher department
 Château de Beauregard

References

Communes of Loir-et-Cher